This is a list of companies headquartered in Olympia, Washington.

Currently based in Olympia
Batdorf & Bronson, coffee roaster
Express Aircraft Company
Fish Brewing Company
ImageSource
K Records
Kill Rock Stars, record label
Mud Bay pet store
Olympic Arms, firearms manufacturer

Formerly based in Olympia or defunct
Olympia Brewing Company (Tumwater)
TULIP Cooperative Credit Union

References

Olympia